James Azah Carter (December 10, 1928 – October 12, 2000), also listed as Bill Carter, was an American baseball pitcher in the Negro leagues. He played with the Newark Eagles in 1948.

References

External links
 and Seamheads

1928 births
2000 deaths
Baseball players from New Jersey
Baseball pitchers
Newark Eagles players
People from Lawrence Township, Mercer County, New Jersey
Sportspeople from Mercer County, New Jersey
20th-century African-American sportspeople